The First Division Monument is located in President's Park, south of State Place Northwest, between 17th Street Northwest and West Executive Avenue Northwest in Washington, DC, United States.  The Monument commemorates those who died while serving in the 1st Infantry Division of the U.S. Army of World War I and subsequent wars.

History
The First Division Monument sits on a plaza in President's Park, west of the White House and south of the Eisenhower Executive Office Building (EEOB) at the corner of 17th Street and State Place, NW. (The EEOB was originally known as the State, War, and Navy Building and then as the Old Executive Office Building.) The monument was conceived by the Society of the First Division, the veterans' organization of the U.S. Army's First Division, to honor the valiant efforts of the soldiers who fought in World War I. Later additions to the monument commemorate the lives of First Division soldiers who fought in subsequent wars. The World War II addition on the west side was dedicated in 1957, the Vietnam War addition on the east side in 1977, and the Desert Storm plaque in 1995. Cass Gilbert was the architect of the original memorial and Daniel Chester French was the sculptor of the Victory statue. Gilbert's son, Cass Gilbert Jr., designed the World War II addition. Both the Vietnam War addition and the Desert Storm plaque were designed by the Philadelphia firm of Harbeson, Hough, Livingston, and Larson. Congressional approval was obtained to erect the First Division Monument and its later additions on federal ground. The Society of the First Division (later called the Society of the First Infantry Division) raised all the funds for the original monument and its additions. No federal money was used. Today, the monument and grounds are maintained by the National Park Service. The monument was built using Milford pink granite

See also
 List of public art in Washington, D.C., Ward 2

References

External links

First Division Monument. Webpage from the National Park Service website.
"First Division Memorial, (sculpture)". SIRIS

1924 sculptures
Artworks in the collection of the National Park Service
Bronze sculptures in Washington, D.C.
Granite sculptures in Washington, D.C.
Military monuments and memorials in the United States
Monuments and memorials in Washington, D.C.
Outdoor sculptures in Washington, D.C.
Sculptures of women in Washington, D.C.
Statues in Washington, D.C.
Sculptures by Daniel Chester French
President's Park
Flags in art